Koniec  (translation: The End) is a village in the administrative district of Gmina Stary Zamość, within Zamość County, Lublin Voivodeship, in eastern Poland.

The village has a population of 860.

References

Koniec